WQDY-FM, on air as Classic Hits 92.7 & 95.3, is an American radio station licensed to Calais, Maine. The station simulcasts on WALZ-FM Machias, Maine (95.3 FM). The station carries a classic hits format, with a heavy emphasis on local sports, including Boston Red Sox baseball. Previous to the station buying Top 40 WCRQ in 2003, which changed its format to country in 2019, WQDY-FM was also carried on AM 1230 WQDY.

History

WQDY launched on July 4, 1959. It originally broadcast on AM 1230. Founders John Vondell and John Foster established the station that year. In 1964, it was sold to Buffalo Bob Smith, best known as the host of children's television series Howdy Doody. Smith also had a summer home on Big Lake in Grand Lake Stream. Dan Hollingdale, who started at the station several months after it originally began, rose through the ranks to become station manager under Smith. Hollingdale bought the station from Smith in 1978.

In 1995, WQDY began simulcasting on WALZ 95.3 FM in Machias, Maine. In 1996, 24/7 operation began on both stations when they were sold to Mike Goodine and Bill McVicar. Goodine had been station manager under Hollingdale. McVicar began career at the station in 1986 as an account executive and play-by-play announcer. In 1998, McVicar, Goodine and partner Roger Holst purchased WALZ-FM in Machias. In 2001, McVicar and Holst took over ownership.

In 2003, the station acquired WCRQ 102.9 FM from Citadel Broadcasting and became a part of the WQDY, Inc. family of stations.

References

External links
Official WQDY-FM website

QDY-FM
Mass media in Washington County, Maine
Classic hits radio stations in the United States
Calais, Maine
Radio stations established in 1959
1959 establishments in Maine